Steven or Steve Ellis may refer to:

 Steve Ellis (comics) (born 1971), American comic book artist and illustrator
 Steve Ellis (musician) (born 1950), English singer
Steve Ellis (literary scholar) (born 1952), British literary scholar and poet
 Steve Ellis (rower) (born 1968), British lightweight rower
 Steven J. R. Ellis (born 1974), Australian archaeologist

See also
 Stephen Ellis (disambiguation)